Proto-oncogene c-KIT is the gene encoding the receptor tyrosine kinase protein known as tyrosine-protein kinase KIT, CD117 (cluster of differentiation 117) or mast/stem cell growth factor receptor (SCFR). Multiple transcript variants encoding different isoforms have been found for this gene.
KIT was first described by the German biochemist Axel Ullrich in 1987 as the cellular homolog of the feline sarcoma viral oncogene v-kit.

Function 

KIT is a cytokine receptor expressed on the surface of hematopoietic stem cells as well as other cell types. Altered forms of this receptor may be associated with some types of cancer. KIT is a receptor tyrosine kinase type III, which binds to stem cell factor , also known as "steel factor" or "c-kit ligand". When this receptor binds to stem cell factor (SCF) it forms a dimer that activates its intrinsic tyrosine kinase activity, that in turn phosphorylates and activates signal transduction molecules that propagate the signal in the cell. After activation, the receptor is ubiquitinated to mark it for transport to a lysosome and eventual destruction. Signaling through KIT plays a role in cell survival, proliferation, and differentiation. For instance, KIT signaling is required for melanocyte survival, and it is also involved in haematopoiesis and gametogenesis.

Structure 
Like other members of the receptor tyrosine kinase III family, KIT consists of an extracellular domain, a transmembrane domain, a juxtamembrane domain, and an intracellular tyrosine kinase domain. The extracellular domain is composed of five immunoglobulin-like domains, and the protein kinase domain is interrupted by a hydrophilic insert sequence of about 80 amino acids. The ligand stem cell factor binds via the second and third immunoglobulin domains.

Cell surface marker 

Cluster of differentiation (CD) molecules are markers on the cell surface, as recognized by specific sets of antibodies, used to identify the cell type, stage of differentiation and activity of a cell. KIT is an important cell surface marker used to identify certain types of hematopoietic (blood) progenitors in the bone marrow. To be specific, hematopoietic stem cells (HSC), multipotent progenitors (MPP), and common myeloid progenitors (CMP) express high levels of KIT. Common lymphoid progenitors (CLP) express low surface levels of KIT. KIT also identifies the earliest thymocyte progenitors in the thymus—early T lineage progenitors (ETP/DN1) and DN2 thymocytes express high levels of c-Kit. It is also a marker for mouse prostate stem cells. In addition, mast cells, melanocytes in the skin, and interstitial cells of Cajal in the digestive tract express KIT. In humans, expression of c-kit in helper-like innate lymphoid cells (ILCs) which lack the expression of CRTH2 (CD294) is used to mark the ILC3 population.

CD117/c-KIT is expressed not only by bone marrow-derived stem cells, but also by those found in other adult organs, such as the prostate, liver, and heart, suggesting that SCF/c-KIT signaling pathways may contribute to stemness in some organs. Additionally, c-KIT has been associated with numerous biological processes in other cell types. For example, c-KIT signaling, has been shown to regulate oogenesis, folliculogenesis, and spermatogenesis, playing important roles in female and male fertility.

Mobilization 

Hematopoietic progenitor cells are normally present in the blood at low levels. Mobilization is the process by which progenitors are made to migrate from the bone marrow into the bloodstream, thus increasing their numbers in the blood. Mobilization is used clinically as a source of hematopoietic stem cells for hematopoietic stem cell transplantation (HSCT). Signaling through KIT has been implicated in mobilization. At the current time, G-CSF is the main drug used for mobilization; it indirectly activates KIT. Plerixafor (an antagonist of CXCR4-SDF1) in combination with G-CSF, is also being used for mobilization of hematopoietic progenitor cells. Direct KIT agonists are currently being developed as mobilization agents.

Role in cancer 

Activating mutations in this gene are associated with gastrointestinal stromal tumors, testicular seminoma, mast cell disease, melanoma, acute myeloid leukemia, while inactivating mutations are associated with the genetic defect piebaldism.

c-KIT plays an important role in regulating many mechanisms leading to tumor formation and progression of carcinomas. c-KIT has been proposed as a regulator of stemness in several cancers. Its expression has been linked to cancer stemness in ovarian cancer cells, colon cancer cells, non-small cell lung cancer cells, and prostate cancer cells. c-KIT has also been linked to the epithelial-mesenchymal transition (EMT), which is important for tumor aggressiveness and metastatic potential. Ectopic expression of c-KIT and EMT have been linked in denoid cystic carcinoma of the salivary gland, thymic carcinomas, ovarian cancer cells, and prostate cancer cells. Several lines of evidence suggest that SCF/c-KIT signaling plays an important role in the tumor microenvironment. For example, in mice high levels of c-KIT in mast cells as well as its presence in the tumor microenvironment promote angiogenesis, leading to increased tumor growth and metastasis.

Anti-KIT therapies

KIT is a proto-oncogene, meaning that overexpression or mutations of this protein can lead to cancer. Seminomas, a subtype of testicular germ cell tumors, frequently have activating mutations in exon 17 of KIT.  In addition, the gene encoding KIT is frequently overexpressed and amplified in this tumor type, most commonly occurring as a single gene amplicon. Mutations of KIT have also been implicated in leukemia, a cancer of hematopoietic progenitors, melanoma, mast cell disease, and gastrointestinal stromal tumors (GISTs). The efficacy of imatinib (trade name Gleevec), a KIT inhibitor, is determined by the mutation status of KIT:

When the mutation has occurred in exon 11 (as is the case many times in GISTs), the tumors are responsive to imatinib. However, if the mutation occurs in exon 17 (as is often the case in seminomas and leukemias), the receptor is not inhibited by imatinib. In those cases other inhibitors such as dasatinib and nilotinib can be used. Researchers investigated the dynamic behavior of wild type and mutant D816H KIT receptor, and emphasized the extended A-loop (EAL) region (805-850) by conducting computational analysis. Their atomic investigation of mutant KIT receptor which emphasized on the EAL region provided a better insight into the understanding of the sunitinib resistance mechanism of the KIT receptor and could help to discover new therapeutics for KIT-based resistant tumor cells in GIST therapy.

The preclinical agent, KTN0182A, is an anti-KIT, pyrrolobenzodiazepine (PBD)-containing antibody-drug conjugate which shows anti-tumor activity in vitro and in vivo against a range of tumor types.

Diagnostic relevance 

Antibodies to KIT are widely used in immunohistochemistry to help distinguish particular types of tumour in histological tissue sections. It is used primarily in the diagnosis of GISTs, which are positive for KIT, but negative for markers such as desmin and S-100, which are positive in smooth muscle and neural tumors, which have a similar appearance. In GISTs, KIT staining is typically cytoplasmic, with stronger accentuation along the cell membranes. KIT antibodies can also be used in the diagnosis of mast cell tumours and in distinguishing seminomas from embryonal carcinomas.

Interactions 

KIT has been shown to interact with:

 APS,
 BCR,
 CD63,
 CD81,
 CD9,
 CRK,
 CRKL,
 DOK1,
 FES,
 GRB10,
 Grb2,
 KITLG,
 LNK,
 LYN,
 MATK,
 MPDZ,
 PIK3R1,
 PTPN11,
 PTPN6,
 STAT1,
 SOCS1,
 SOCS6,
 SRC, and
 TEC.

See also 
 Cytokine receptor
 List of genes mutated in pigmented cutaneous lesions

References

Further reading

External links 
 
 C-kit receptor entry in the public domain NCI Dictionary of Cancer Terms
 

Immunoglobulin superfamily cytokine receptors
EC 2.7.10
Tyrosine kinase receptors